Gösta Dahlberg is a retired Swedish footballer. Dahlberg was part of the Djurgården Swedish champions' team of 1912.

Honours

Club 
 Djurgårdens IF 
 Svenska Mästerskapet: 1912

References

Swedish footballers
Djurgårdens IF Fotboll players
Association footballers not categorized by position
Year of birth missing